Hunter Ellis (born July 5, 1968 in Alexandria, Virginia) is an American military veteran and television personality.

A former naval aviator, he was first noted for his participation on Survivor before going on to host several television shows for the History Channel, including Tactical to Practical; Man, Moment, Machine; and Digging for the Truth, before hosting The CW reality show In Harm's Way. He is the current spokesperson for Atomic Beam flashlight.

Background
Part of a family with a strong tradition in the United States Navy, Ellis is the grandson of Naval Aviator and Vice Admiral Donald D. Engen. He graduated from the University of Southern California with a bachelor's degree in political science, before entering the Navy as a commissioned officer and being designated as a Naval Aviator following completion of flight training. Ellis graduated first in his flight training class and, during his ten-year military service, he amassed 433 carrier landings and more than two thousand hours of flight time in the F/A-18 Hornet.

After resigning his commission, Ellis worked for a time as a pilot for FedEx Corporation.

Personal life
Ellis is a member of the fraternity Alpha Tau Omega. He currently resides in Austin, Texas, with his wife and two children.

Career
Ellis was a participant in the reality TV program Survivor: Marquesas, which was filmed in 2001 and aired in 2002.  A member of the Maraamu tribe, Ellis was the third contestant voted off the show.

Subsequently, Ellis became the host of several nationally televised programs. The first of these was Tactical to Practical (also known as Tactical to Practical With Hunter Ellis), which aired on The History Channel as a program that took a historical look at the development of common consumer electronic products which originated as military research projects. It lasted for three seasons, with 38 episodes airing in 2003-04.

In 2004, he  began co-hosting 9 on the Town, a half-hour program airing five days a week on KCAL-TV (channel 9), an independent station in Los Angeles, California. In 2005, he began hosting another show on The History Channel, called Man, Moment, Machine. Episodes of this show focus on the historical consequences of the momentary interaction between a particular individual and a specific technology.

In 2007, Ellis became the host of Digging for the Truth, and in 2008 became host of In Harm's Way.

Ellis was a news anchor for KEYE-TV news in Austin, Texas from 2011 until he left in 2014 to focus full-time on documentaries.

Filmography
Survivor  (3 episodes, 2002)
Tactical to Practical (2003) (TV)
9 on the Town (2004) (TV)
Test Drive (1 episode, 2005) (TV)
Man, Moment, Machine (13 episodes, 2005–2007)
Extreme Yachts (2006) (TV)
Digging for the Truth (8 episodes, 2007)
In Harm's Way (2008) (TV)
A Grail of Two Idiots (2012) (short)
Misirlou (2013)

Awards and recognition
In 2003, Ellis received an Emmy nomination for hosting Countdown to Survivor: The Amazon for KCBS-TV, and in 2006 he received a Los Angeles Emmy Award for hosting Hola! Survivor: Guatemala, also for KCBS. In an article published on December 1, 2003, People magazine named him one of the 20 sexiest men on cable television.

References

External links
 
 Hunter Ellis biography at for Survivor: Marquesas at CBS.com

1968 births
Living people
United States Navy officers
United States Naval Aviators
University of Southern California people
Aviators from Virginia
Male actors from Alexandria, Virginia
American political scientists
Male actors from Austin, Texas
Survivor (American TV series) contestants